Suspol may refer to:

 Sussex Police in United Kingdom
 Suspol, Leh, a village in India